The men's 400 metres event  at the 1994 European Athletics Indoor Championships was held in Palais Omnisports de Paris-Bercy on 11, 12 and 13 March.

Medalists

Results

Heats
First 3 from each heat (Q) and the next 3 fastest (q) qualified for the semifinals.

Semifinals
First 3 from each semifinal qualified directly (Q) for the final.

Final

References

400 metres at the European Athletics Indoor Championships
400